Andrew Kirkaldy (born 1 March 1976 in St Andrews) is a British racing driver and managing director of McLaren GT.

Career

Single-seaters
Kirkaldy began his career competing in karting, winning the Scottish Junior Championship in 1989 and the Scottish Senior Championship in 1993. He raced in the Formula Vauxhall championship in 1996 and 1997, finishing runner-up in 1997. He also won the McLaren Autosport BRDC Award in that year, which earnt him a prize test with the McLaren Formula One team. He was runner-up in Euroseries Formula Opel in 1998. He raced in the British Formula Three Championship in 1999 and 2000.

Sports cars
In addition to finishing runner-up in the Renault Clio Cup in 2002, Kirkaldy made his FIA GT Championship debut. In 2004 he moved to the British GT Championship, winning the series in 2005 with teammate Nathan Kinch for Scuderia Ecosse. He also made his 24 Hours of Le Mans debut in 2005 for the team. He returned to the FIA GT Championship in 2006 with Scuderia Ecosse, racing in the GT2 class. In 2008, he drove for his CRS Racing team in the championship.

Team AKA & CRS Racing
As well as his racing career, Kirkaldy is a successful team principal, founding his own Team AKA team in 2004. The team ran for four seasons in the British Formula Renault Championship, ending up with a second in the 2006 teams championship. The team also achieved two top-three drivers championship positions with James Jakes, who was third in 2005, and Patrick Hogan, who was second in 2006 only after losing a tie-breaker to Sebastian Hohenthal. In 2007 Chris Niarchos approached Kirkaldy with sponsoring of Team AKA in their fourth season of the British Formula Renault Championship, with the two having previously been team-mates on the Scuderia Ecosse team which competed in the FIA GT Championship. Team AKA then became known as AKA Cobra.

Following the 2007 season, Niarchos' interest in the team expanded as the two wished to enter their own team in not only the FIA GT Championship but the British GT Championship as well, ending their relationship with Scuderia Ecosse. The team was renamed once more and was relaunched as CR Scuderia, reflecting their choice of Italian Ferraris for their entry into grand tourer racing. The team was again renamed for 2009, becoming CRS Racing. Subsequently, CRS agreed a deal with McLaren to develop the GT3 version of the McLaren MP4-12C.

24 Hours of Le Mans results

References

External links

Career statistics at Driver Database

Living people
1976 births
Sportspeople from St Andrews
Scottish racing drivers
British Formula Three Championship drivers
German Formula Three Championship drivers
Atlantic Championship drivers
Formula Renault Eurocup drivers
24 Hours of Le Mans drivers
FIA GT Championship drivers
British GT Championship drivers
European Le Mans Series drivers
Blancpain Endurance Series drivers
International GT Open drivers
24 Hours of Spa drivers
Sports car racing team owners
Porsche Carrera Cup GB drivers
ASCAR drivers
People educated at Madras College
CRS Racing drivers
Alan Docking Racing drivers
McLaren people
Paul Stewart Racing drivers